This is a list of law enforcement agencies in the state of Delaware.

According to the US Bureau of Justice Statistics' 2008 Census of State and Local Law Enforcement Agencies, the state had 49 law enforcement agencies employing 2,131 sworn police officers, about 243 for each 100,000 residents.

State agencies 

 Delaware Division of Alcohol and Tobacco Enforcement
 Delaware Capitol Police
 Delaware Department of Correction
Delaware State Probation and Parole
 Delaware Department of Justice
 Criminal Division
 Delaware Department of Natural Resources and Environmental Control
 Environmental Protection Officers
 Fish & Wildlife Natural Resources Police Officers
 Parks & Recreation Natural Resources Police Officers (State Park Rangers)
 Delaware Office of Animal Welfare (State Animal Control Officers)
 Delaware State Police
Delaware Office of the Fire Marshal
Delaware Justice of the Peace Court Constables

County agencies 

 New Castle County Police Department

Municipal agencies 

 Bethany Beach Police Department 
 Blades Police Department 
 Bridgeville Police Department
 Camden Police Department
 Cheswold Police Department
 Clayton Police Department
 Dagsboro Police Department
 Delaware City Police Department
 Delmar Police Department
 Dewey Beach Police Department
 Dover Police Department
 Ellendale Police Department
 Elsmere Police Department

 Felton Police Department
 Fenwick Island Police Department 
 Frederica Police Department 
 Georgetown Police Department
 Greenwood Police Department 
 Harrington Police Department 
 Kenton Police Department 
 Laurel Police Department
 Lewes Police Department
 Middletown Police Department
 Milford Police Department 
 Millsboro Police Department

 Milton Police Department 
 New Castle City Police Department 
 Newark Police Department 
 Newport Police Department 
 Ocean View Police Department 
 Rehoboth Beach Police Department 
 Seaford Police Department 
 Selbyville Police Department 
 Smyrna Police Department
 South Bethany Police Department
 Wilmington Police Department
 Wyoming Police Department

University agencies 
 Delaware State University Police Department
 Delaware Technical Community College Public Safety Department
 University of Delaware Police Department
 Wilmington University Public Safety & Constables

Other agencies 

 Bayhealth Medical Center Constable
 Christiana Care Health System Department of Public Safety Constables
 Beebe Healthcare Department of Public Safety 
 Nemours Alfred I. duPont Hospital for Children Constables
 Tower Hill School Constables
 Delaware River and Bay Authority Police Department
 Ellendale Recovery Response Center
 Port of Wilmington Harbor Police Department
 Delaware Metropolitan Transit Authority Constables and Public Safety
 Department of Veterans Affairs Police, Wilmington Delaware.

References

Delaware
Law enforcement agencies of Delaware
Law enforcement agencies